Penny Tinditina  also known as Penny Jakana (died on April 19, 2017) was the former Uganda Television news anchor, Radio one news anchor and presenter and BBC journalist in the early 2000s. She died at the age of 39.

Background 
In 2016, Penny was diagnosed with Lung Cancer and died in  2017 in Seattle, United States where she had battled for her life for more than a year. Her funeral service held at Watoto Church in Kampala. She was remembered for being kind, polite and focused. When she died, a memorial fund was created by friends on Gofundme.com to support her funeral financially in Uganda. She was buried at her ancestral home in Nyakiganda village in Nyabuhikye, Ibanda District. Her vigil took place at her parents' home in Buwaate-Najeela. She was described by the  husband  as a loving and courageous woman who not only had time for the family but also transformed him.

Career 
She worked at Bill and Melinda Gates Foundation in the Washington State, US at the time of her death and was a former journalist with BBC. She also worked at Uganda Television now known as UBC.

Personal life 
Penny had three children named; Darren, Dione and Divine with her husband Alex Jakana.

See also 

 Brenda Zobbo
 Alex Jakana 
 Alan Kasujja
 Bill and Melinda Gates Foundation
 Elvis Kalema
 Edris Kiggundu

References

External links 
Website of Bill and Melinda Gates Foundation
https://theatrestudioinc.org/search/former-radio-ubc-news-anchor-tinditina-penny

Ugandan radio presenters
Ugandan women radio presenters
Ugandan television presenters
Ugandan women television presenters
2017 deaths
Ugandan women journalists
Ibanda District
People from Ibanda District
Ugandan journalists
Ugandan women television journalists